Radim Vlasák (born 5 January 1974) is a retired Czech football player who played in the Czech First League for FC Boby Brno and FK Teplice.

References

External links
 

1974 births
Living people
Czech footballers
Czech Republic under-21 international footballers
Association football goalkeepers
Czech First League players
FC Zbrojovka Brno players
FK Teplice players